The District of Columbia War Memorial commemorates the citizens of the District of Columbia who served in World War I. Located on the National Mall, it was constructed in 1931 as a domed, peristyle Doric temple.

History

The memorial was built to honor World War I soldiers that died in the war. It stands in West Potomac Park slightly off of Independence Avenue in a grove of trees. Authorized by an act of Congress on June 7, 1924, funds to construct the memorial were provided by the contributions of both organizations and individual citizens of the District. Construction of the memorial began in the spring of 1931, and the memorial was dedicated by President Herbert Hoover on November 11, 1931 (Armistice Day). It was the first war memorial to be erected in West Potomac Park, part of the National Mall near the Lincoln Memorial, and remains the only local District memorial on the National Mall.

Preserved in the cornerstone of the District of Columbia World War Memorial is a list of 26,000 Washingtonians who served in the Great War. Inscribed on the base are the names of the 499 District of Columbia citizens who lost their lives in the war, together with medallions representing the branches of the armed forces.

In September 2008, Rep. Ted Poe of Texas, with the support of Frank Buckles, then the last living US veteran of World War I, proposed a bill in Congress stating the memorial should be expanded and designated the national memorial to World War I.

In July 2010, the National Park Service announced that restoration work, funded by the American Recovery and Reinvestment Act of 2009, would soon begin on the memorial. Work began in October 2010, and the memorial reopened on November 10, 2011.  It was listed on the National Register of Historic Places in 2014.

The memorial is administered by the National Park Service under its National Mall and Memorial Parks unit.

See also

List of public art in Washington, D.C., Ward 2
National Register of Historic Places listings in central Washington, D.C.
16th Street World War I Memorial Trees
National World War I Memorial (Washington, D.C.) (planned)

References

Further reading 
 Views of the National Parks – National Park Service
 Historic American Buildings Survey (2005), No. HABS DC-857

External links

 http://www.ww1cc.org/memorial U.S. World War I Centennial Commission
 World War I Memorial Foundation
 DC Preservation League Most Endangered Places for 2003
 District of Columbia Service in World War One and the DC World War Memorial

World War I memorials in the United States
Monuments and memorials in Washington, D.C.
National Mall
Pavilions in the United States
Monuments and memorials on the National Register of Historic Places in Washington, D.C.
Buildings and structures completed in 1931
Neoclassical architecture in Washington, D.C.
Greek Revival architecture in Washington, D.C.
Southwest (Washington, D.C.)